Praise This is an upcoming American musical comedy film directed by Tina Gordon.

Cast
 Chloe Bailey
 Anjelika Washington
 Quavo
 Druski 
 Koryn Hawthorne
 Tristan Mack Wilds
 Kiara Iman Heffner 
 Ilario Grant 
 Birgundi Baker 
 Loren Lott, 
 Crystal Renee Hayslett 
 Cocoa Brown 
 Vanessa Fraction 
 Kountry Wayne.

Production
In June 2019, it was announced Tina Gordon would be directing Praise This from an original pitch by Tim Story's The Story Company. In April 2022, Chloe Bailey had signed on to star in the film.

Release
In May 2022, it was announced the film would premiere on Peacock.

References

External Links
 
 

2023 films
2023 comedy films
American musical comedy films
2020s English-language films
Films about religion
Films shot in Atlanta
Peacock (streaming service) original films
Universal Pictures films
Will Packer Productions films